Leslie John McPhillips (21 March 1910 – 1 September 2004) was an Australian communist and trade unionist. He joined the Communist Party of Australia in 1929.

Jack was one of the early generation of CPA union officials, he was a long-time leader of the Communist Party of Australia and was prominent in the union movement of the 1940s, '50s and '60s. When the CPA denounced the Soviet intervention in Czechoslovakia, McPhillips sided with the pro-Soviet tendency in the party. He opposed the new 'Eurocommunist' line of the party. In 1971 he took part in breaking away from CPA and forming the Socialist Party of Australia. He was President of SPA from 1984 to 1988.

Works

1944: The Work of Our Union: Summary of a Report
1952: Arbitration?
1954: Act Now to Defend Living Conditions
1958: Penal Powers: Menzies' Weapon Against Unions and Wages
1961: Today's Wages Fight
1963: Penal Powers Cost Unionists £1,000,000!
1974: BHP Loses £15,000 and Much Prestige
1981: Communists and the Trade Unions
1985: The Accord and Its Consequences: Trade Union Experiences
1994: Wharfies and Miners Say "Enough is Enough": The Story of the 1994 Wharfies' and Miners' Disputes

See also
List of foreign delegations at the 9th SED Congress

External links
Obituary in The Guardian (25 August issue)
Obituary in Green Left Weekly
Obituary at Bella Ciao

Australian communists
Australian trade unionists
1910 births
2004 deaths
Communist Party of Australia members